Eruera Hamiora Tumutara (1859 – 11 January 1930) was a notable New Zealand  Ringatū bishop. Of Māori descent, he identified with the Ngati Awa and Ngati Tuwharetoa iwi. He was born in Te Whaiti, Bay of Plenty, New Zealand, in about 1859.

References

1859 births
1930 deaths
People from the Bay of Plenty Region
Ngāti Awa people
Ngāti Tūwharetoa people
New Zealand Ringatū clergy